Tiger, Blood in the Mouth is a 2016 film directed by Hernán Belón, written by Hernán Belón and Marcelo Pitrola and starring Leonardo Sbaraglia, Eva De Dominici and Érica Bianchi.

Plot 
Ramon is 50 year old boxer who is happy with career and family. He works out at a gym daily. One day, Debora, a 25 year old aspiring boxer to be, joins at the gym. He fantasizes about her that night. The next morning, Debora comes into the shower where he is, and they have sex. They begin a relationship and have aggressive sex whenever they can. Ramon's life drastically changes due to this and he has to fix everything.

Cast 
 Leonardo Sbaraglia as Ramón
 Eva De Dominici as Débora
 Érica Bianchi as Carina (as Erica Banchi)
 Osmar Núñez as Di Nucci
 Claudio Rissi as Mario
 Benicio Mutti Spinetta as Maxi
 Camila Zolezzi as Yanina
 Aldo Onofri as Peralta
 Richard Wagener as Cachi
 Diego Chavez as Diamante Saldías (as Diego "La Joya" Chaves)
 Erica Farías as Cuchila Rígoli (as Érica "La Pantera" Farías)
 Pablo Paoliello as Elvis Zambrano (as Pablo "El Elvis" Paoliello)
 Osvaldo Príncipi as Locutor Primera Pelea
 Marcelo Pitrola as Hombre de la AFIP
 Ana Laura Pérez as Maestra (as Ana Laura Pérez Pacor)

Release 
Tiger, Blood in the Mouth was released on 25 August 2016 in Argentina.

References

External links
 
 

2016 films
Argentine drama films
Italian drama films
2010s Spanish-language films
2010s Argentine films